Dark Fortress is a German melodic black metal band from Landshut formed in 1994. They have released seven studio albums, a split album and a demo album.

History

Early history 
The band formed in 1994. In 1996 they released the demo Rebirth of the Dark Age. In 1997 the original line-up, consisting of band founder Asvargr (guitar), vocalist Azathoth, Njord on bass, and drummer Charon established the band's first live line-up with the addition of a second guitarist named Crom and keyboardist Thamuz. Debuting live in February 1997 the band soon played dates alongside acts such as Lunar Aurora, Disaster and Naglfar. Dark Fortress' first label release was the split MCD with Barad Dür entitled Towards Immortality, which featured two new tracks by the band and was released on Fog of the Apocalypse Records. A third track was recorded during the same session and was used for the compilation CD From The Mystic Forest – Part II. The band continued composing material for their first full-length album, but recording was postponed from 1998 until August 2000, when Dark Fortress entered Klangschmiede Studio E and with Markus Stock (of Empyrium) completed their album Tales From Eternal Dusk. Heavily influenced by groups like Dissection, Unanimated, and Satyricon, the album received positive reviews and offered a mixture of haunting guitar melodies, morbid and tormented snarling and diversified song structures.

Changes 
Charon and Crom left due to conflicting musical interests, and these line-up changes further delayed live and studio activities. However they later signed to US label Red Stream for two albums and hired Seraph and V.Santura as the new drummer and guitarist. Recorded at famous Grieghallen Studio in Norway (Mayhem, Emperor, Immortal) Profane Genocidal Creations was delayed due to problems during the mixing/mastering process. It was not released until February 2003 and showcased Dark Fortress' development into classic traditions of black metal as well as their continual progression as composers and musicians. With a stable line-up consisting of Azathoth (vocals), Asvargr (guitar), Santura (guitar), Draug (bass), Paymon (keyboards) and Seraph (drums) more live shows and festival appearances followed, seeing Dark Fortress share stages with popular extreme metal acts like Behemoth, Impaled Nazarene, Pungent Stench, and God Dethroned, as well as many underground acts.

2000–present 
The hitherto musical peak of their career then hit the metal scene with the 2004 release of Stab Wounds (Black Attakk). Accompanied by gloomy artwork by artist Travis Smith (Opeth, Nevermore, Anathema, Death) Stab Wounds was well received not only by the band's underground following but also mainstream metal press. The German edition of Rock Hard praised it as "too good, too original and heavy to be ignored. Simply the best German black metal has to offer!". Their new album contained melancholy melodies combined with suicidal themes. An interpretation of Katatonia's "Endtime" was included on the limited CD Digipak, while a cover version of Emperor's "I Am The Black Wizards" was featured on the double-LP version (released by Imperium Records, 2005).

On 13 May 2007, they fired their vocalist, Azathoth, due to various non-musical reasons. His replacement was Morean.

Their next album was entitled Séance, again accompanied by the artwork of Travis Smith. The album is a concept album about the direct contrast between the current and the future, the fragility of human existence with its most striking weaknesses – ignorance, arrogance and false illusions – and the crass finality of death. The central lyrical motif of Séance departs from typical black metal subjects and instead deals with the idea of paranormal beings. The musical side supports this conceptual idea with gloomy guitar melodies, twisted and morbid passages and grim vocals.

On 29 January 2010, Dark Fortress released an official music video for the song "Hirudineans". This song is on their 2010 album Ylem.

Members

Current members 
 Asvargr – guitar, backing vocals (1994–present)
 V. Santura – guitar, bass, backing vocals (2001–present)
 Morean – lead vocals (2007–present)
 Phenex – keyboards, backing vocals (2014–present)

Former members 
Paymon – keyboards, backing vocals (1997–2014)
Azathoth  – lead vocals (1994–2007)
Njord – bass, backing vocals (1994–1997)
Zoltan – bass, backing vocals (1997–2000)
Draug – bass, backing vocals (2001–2018)
Seraph – drums, percussion (2000–2022)
Charon – drums, percussion (1994–2000)
Crom – guitar, bass, backing vocals (1997–2001)
Thamuz – keyboards, backing vocals (1997)

Timeline

Discography 
Rebirth of the Dark Age demo (1996)
Towards Immortality split (1997)
Tales from Eternal Dusk (2001)
Profane Genocidal Creations (2003)
Stab Wounds (2004)
Séance (2006)
Eidolon (2008)
Ylem (2010)
Venereal Dawn (2014)
Spectres from the Old World (2020)

References

External links 

 Official website
 
 
 Encyclopaedia Metallum
 Dark Fortress at Century Media Records

German heavy metal musical groups
German black metal musical groups
Musical groups established in 1994
Century Media Records artists
1994 establishments in Germany